The 2023 South Carolina Gamecocks baseball team represents the University of South Carolina in the 2023 NCAA Division I baseball season. The 2023 season marks the Gamecocks' 130th overall. The Gamecocks play their home games at Founders Park, and are led by sixth year head coach Mark Kingston.

Previous season

The Gamecocks finished 27–28, 13–17 in the SEC

Personnel

Roster

Coaching staff

Opening Day lineup

Schedule and results

Regular season

February
UMass–Lowell (Opening day)

South Carolina opened its season with a 20–3 win over Umass Lowell, 8 Gamecocks had hits and Braylen Wimmer had 5 hits and 1 HR, Will McGillis hit 2 HR's, Cole Messina had a HR and drove in 3. Will Sanders struck out 3 and only allowed 3 hits. James Hicks picked up the win pitching two scoreless innings and striking out 2. 

South Carolina would go on to win the next two games and sweep UMass-Lowell 17–1, and then 12–1

Winthrop

Queens

Penn

South Carolina swept Penn 7–4, 1–0, 6–5

March

vs. Clemson (Greenville)

Clemson

at USC Upstate (Greenville)

Bethune–Cookman

at Georgia

at Georgia

Record vs. conference opponents

Rankings

See also
2023 South Carolina Gamecocks softball team

References

South Carolina
South Carolina Gamecocks baseball seasons
South Carolina Gamecocks baseball